The 1965 PGA Championship was the 47th PGA Championship, played August 12–15 at Laurel Valley Golf Club in Ligonier, Pennsylvania, a suburb southeast of Pittsburgh. Dave Marr won his only major championship, two strokes ahead of runners-up Billy Casper and Jack Nicklaus.

Marr was the co-leader after 54 holes with Tommy Aaron, a stroke ahead of Gardner Dickinson and two shots ahead of major champions Nicklaus and Casper. Aaron shot 78 and Dickinson 74 on Sunday, while Marr matched an even-par 71 with Nicklaus and Casper.

Not far from his hometown of Latrobe, Laurel Valley was co-founded by Arnold Palmer in 1959, who had another disappointing major in his home state and finished 14 strokes back, tied for 33rd. Three years earlier, he lost an 18-hole playoff to Nicklaus in the U.S. Open at Oakmont near Pittsburgh, then finished tied for 17th five weeks later at the PGA Championship at Aronimink, outside Philadelphia. (Palmer won the other two majors of 1962, the Masters and the Open Championship, but never won the PGA Championship for a career grand slam.)

After the practice rounds, a  fir tree was installed on the par-5 third hole to prevent corner-cutting from the tee to an adjacent fairway, over the objections of the club professional.

This was the final PGA Championship appearance for two-time champion Ben Hogan, age 53, who tied for 15th place. After his near-fatal auto accident in early 1949, Hogan's legs could not withstand the grueling match play schedule and he did not play again in the championship until it became a stroke play event. He missed the 54-hole cut by a stroke in 1960 and tied for ninth place in 1964. Hogan won the title as a match play event in 1946 and 1948. Twenty former champions were in the field and twelve made the cut. Palmer was assessed a two-stroke penalty in both of the first two rounds and was at 147 (+5), ten shots back.

A decade later, Laurel Valley hosted the Ryder Cup in 1975, the last Ryder Cup held in the U.S. without players from continental Europe.

Course layout

Source:

Past champions in the field

Made the cut

Missed the cut 

Source:

Round summaries

First round
Thursday, August 12, 1965

Source:

Second round
Friday, August 13, 1965

Source:

Third round
Saturday, August 14, 1965

Source:

Final round
Sunday, August 15, 1965

Source:

Television
This was the first PGA Championship televised by the ABC network, which retained the broadcast rights through 1990, when it was succeeded by CBS.

References

External links
PGA Media Guide 2012
PGA.com – 1965 PGA Championship

PGA Championship
Golf in Pennsylvania
PGA Championship
PGA Championship
PGA Championship
PGA Championship